"The Worst Is Yet to Come" is a World War I-era song recorded on December 12, 1918 in Camden, New Jersey. Sam M. Lewis and Joe Young provided the lyrics. Bert Grant was the composer. The song was published by Waterson, Berlin & Snyder, Inc. in New York City. Billy Murray performed the song. Artist Albert Wilfred Barbelle designed the cover art for the sheet music. On one version of the cover, a soldier is in position to bayonet a prisoner in bed.

The lyrics of the song blatantly mock Wilhelm II, the German Emperor during World War I. The second verse reads: 
 
The chorus of the song joyfully states to the Germans that it's only going to get worse from here, and that the "crazy Kaiser" must give up:

References 

Songs about Wilhelm II
Songs about death
1918 songs
Songs of World War I
Songs with lyrics by Sam M. Lewis
Songs with lyrics by Joe Young (lyricist)
Songs with music by Bert Grant